Rob Powdrill (born 5 April 1984) is an Australian former professional boxer, kickboxer, Muay Thai fighter and mixed martial artist. He has held the International Boxing Organization Inter-Continental light heavyweight title, World Boxing Council Eurasia Pacific Boxing Council light heavyweight title; and challenged for the World Kickboxing Network super middleweight title.

Boxing 

Powdrill made his professional boxing debut on 23 June 2007. On 8 November 2014 in Brisbane, Australia he caused Australia's upset of the year by knocking out London Olympian Damien Hooper in 21 seconds, as well as claimed WBC Eurasia Pacific Boxing Council light heavyweight title.
On 22 August in New Plymouth, New Zealand, Powdrill took a split decision against Sam Rapira, earning a vacant IBO Inter-Continental light heavyweight title.

Kickboxing 
Over the course of his career Powdrill won numerous State and national championship belts, including the 2010 WKN Australian super light heavyweight title against Ricardo Miranda of Queensland via the fourth-round TKO, battling out at the semi-main event at Domination 4: JWP vs. Valent for WKN World super welterweight title.

On 17 March 2012 Powdrill challenged for the World Kickboxing Network super middleweight title facing the second-round knockout defeat against Francis Tavares in Agde, France.
He was the first Australian kickboxer to compete in France in 17 years.

On 12 September 2015, representing Australia as a part of the WKN Top Team managed by Parviz Iskenderov, Powdrill competed at the international event "Circle" held in Barcelona, where he faced a defeat via decision against Spanish Lorenzo Javier Jorge.

On 12 August 2017 he took part in the 16-man kickboxing tournament (under 80 kg) "Ozzie Toughman" held on the Gold Coast, Australia.
He fought three fights in one evening, facing a decision defeat in the first fight, a draw in the second, and the first-round TKO defeat in the third.

Mixed martial arts 
Powdrill made his professional debut in MMA on 20 December 2009 in Sydney, NSW, winning via the first-round submission against Nathan Hurihangani. On 29 June 2012 he fought and lost against David Johnson via the first-round submission (RNC) in Perth, Western Australia.

Powdrill is expected to fight Peter Davenport of Melbourne at the Australian Fighting Championship event (AFC 24) held on 17 March 2018 in Perth, Western Australia.

References 

1984 births
Living people
Sportspeople from Perth, Western Australia
Sportsmen from Western Australia
Australian male boxers
Australian male kickboxers
Australian Muay Thai practitioners
Australian male mixed martial artists
Mixed martial artists utilizing boxing
Mixed martial artists utilizing Muay Thai